Total Drama: Revenge of the Island (also called TDROTI for short) is the fourth season of Total Drama. The series' extension was commissioned by Teletoon from the producers, Fresh TV. It is a sequel to Total Drama Island, Total Drama Action, and Total Drama World Tour and is a parody of reality TV shows, with this season taking the contestants back to Camp Wawanakwa (the original setting of the first season), only this time the island is radioactive. Previous contestants from past seasons no longer compete in Total Drama: Revenge of the Island since this season features an entire new cast. The thirteen new contestants who are introduced in here are Anne Maria, B, Brick, Cameron, Dakota, Dawn, Jo, Lightning, Mike, Sam, Scott, Staci, and Zoey. This season has new friendships, new rivalries, and new relationships. However, the season is only half the length of any previous seasons, with just 13 episodes. The season introduced the new cast to what previous contestants have gone through before and prepared them for Total Drama All-Stars. Such a change occurred again in Total Drama: Pahkitew Island.

Plot
Like Total Drama Island, this season is a fictional reality show that follows the competition of thirteen new contestants at Camp Wawanakwa, a summer camp on a fictional island located in an unspecified area in Muskoka, Ontario. However, since the island has been forgotten and left alone for the past two seasons, the island has been used as a toxic nuclear waste dump, transforming it into the perfect location for the most dramatic and brutal challenges yet. The new cast of campers must then participate in competitions to avoid being voted off the island as they all try to get ready to compete with some of the most popular original contestants in the fourth season. They spend almost 2 weeks (13 days) in this camp competing in challenges for immunity and at the end of the season, one winning contestant will have the chance to win C$1,000,000 (US$731,485.00). The competition is hosted by Chris McLean (Christian Potenza), who is assisted by the camp's chef, Chef Hatchet (Clé Bennett).

At the beginning of the season, the thirteen campers are placed onto two teams, the Mutant Maggots and the Toxic Rats. In each episode, the teams participate in a challenge, in which one or more campers can win invincibility for their team. The losing team is called to the elimination ceremony at night, where they vote one of their own members off the island. At the ceremony, Chris declares which contestants are safe by calling their name and giving them a marshmallow, while the one whose name is not called is eliminated from the game and given a radioactive marshmallow. The eliminated camper is then taken to the Hurl of Shame and catapulted. However, an eliminated camper can stay in the game if they find a wooden Chris head (the elimination goes to the contestant with the second most number of votes).

About halfway through the season, the Toxic Rats and the Mutant Maggots are disbanded, after which the challenges continue; the winner of each challenge then only receives invincibility for him or herself, whereupon a camper without invincibility is voted off the island. This process of elimination is continued on until two players (Cameron and Lightning) remain on the island, where then they are subject to a final contest. At the end of the season, Cameron is crowned winner of the season and is given the million dollars by Chris. Lightning however, wins in the alternate ending.

Episodes

Total Drama: Revenge of the Island premiered on both Teletoon and Cartoon Network in 2012. Teletoon aired Total Drama: Revenge of the Island in Canada on Thursday nights at 7:00 p.m. EST from January 5, 2012, to April 12, 2012, while on June 5, 2012, the U.S. started airing it on Tuesday nights at 7:30 p.m. EST on Cartoon Network. However, the first worldwide airing for this season was in France via Canal+ Family.

Episode finale variations
For every season, the show's producers create two alternate endings for the final episode, such that the winner seen in one country's broadcasts is the runner-up in other countries (and vice versa) where the show airs. Cameron is the original winner in Canada, but he is also shown as the winner in Australia, Bulgaria, Croatia, Denmark, France, Hungary, Israel, Italy, Latin America and Brazil (Cartoon Network), the Middle East, the Netherlands, New Zealand, the Philippines, Portugal, Russia, Serbia, Singapore, Spain, South Africa, Turkey, United Kingdom, and the United States. Lightning is the original runner-up in Canada, but he is also the winner in Finland, Japan, Latin America and Brazil (Boomerang and TBS) Norway, Poland, Romania and Sweden.

Characters 

Unlike previous seasons, Total Drama: Revenge of the Island features a new set of contestants, which are Anne Maria, B, Brick, Cameron, Dakota, Dawn, Jo, Lightning, Mike, Sam, Scott, Staci, and Zoey. All of the new contestants have their own audition tapes for the season. They can be seen online on Teletoon's official website, online on Cartoon Network's official website, or on YouTube.

Staff

Contestants

Original concepts

In the early production stages, the character lineup had twelve contestants, and most of them had body shapes, colors, clothing, heights, hair styles and faces that were completely different from the final designs. The thirteenth character who was added later was B. His design was similar to that of the character in the Total Drama Island special as the man in the car when Courtney "discovered" civilization. That character also happened to be DJ's prototype from the original Camp TV promos. Jo was later renamed to B (which stands for Beverly) while also getting his final design. The only other characters to have their name changed was Mary; she ended up using the name 'Jo'. Despite the rename, this character underwent the least amount of change in design. The other contestant who got renamed was Molly, being renamed to 'Zoey', while also carrying over her label. Anne Maria, Brick, Lightning and Scott had minor modifications made to their outfits. Sam and Scott had different facial hair. The characters who had the most changes made to their designs were Dakota, Staci, and Zoey. Zoey's final design actually used the clothing and body shape from the original design for Dakota. Mike and Cameron had their ethnicities changed. Dawn, who was not in the original lineup, replaced an unused character named Zoey. Cameron's initial design would be reused for Jay and Mickey on Total Drama Presents: The Ridonculous Race.

Cameos
Although the original contestants did not compete again in this season (according to Chris, they had outlived their usefulness), nine of them still had cameo appearances throughout the season: Bridgette, DJ, Duncan, Ezekiel, Gwen, Heather, Izzy, Lindsay, and Owen. However, at the beginning of the season, all of the original contestants (except for Blaineley) were seen together on a yacht, revealing their status after Total Drama World Tour. They were all last seen (except for the nine who cameo) leaving on the yacht right before the new contestants were first introduced.

A list of all the cameos in Total Drama: Revenge of the Island and their roles during their cameos are shown below:

The fifteen original contestants who no longer appeared after the first episode of the fourth season were Alejandro, Beth, Cody, Courtney, Eva, Geoff, Harold, Justin, Katie, Leshawna, Noah, Sadie, Sierra, Trent, and Tyler. Harold was thought to have a cameo as soon as Brian Froud was confirmed to be part of the cast, but it turned out that Brian voices Sam instead. Out of all the cameos, Ezekiel is the only original contestant who made cameos in more than one episode in the season (by this point in the series, however, he was a completely feral beast who was incapable of speaking English and his role served as a plot antagonist), while DJ is the only cameoing character who has the same voice actor as a main character (Chef) already with a major role.

Elimination Table

Color Key
  Finalist: This contestant made it to the final of the competition.
  Win: This contestant/their team won the challenge and/or was immune from elimination.
  Safe: This contestant was safe from elimination.
  Low: This contestant was supposed to be eliminated from the competition but used a McLean-Brand Chris Head, which granted them immunity.
  Low: This contestant was at risk of being eliminated, as the last one to get a marshmallow.
  Eliminated: This contestant was eliminated.
  Eliminated: This contestant quit, was evacuated, or got disqualified.
  This contestant is out of the competition.

Production
Total Drama: Revenge of the Island was developed and produced by Fresh TV and distributed by Cake Entertainment. Since all the characters in this season are completely new, the studio had to hire several new voice actors to voice the new characters, but Brian Froud (the voice actor of Harold) returned to voice Sam, one of the new characters. This season was directed by Keith Oliver and Chad Hicks, and Todd Kauffman had a small role in the making of this season. Production started in early 2010 when the season was first announced as Total Drama Reloaded, and the new characters were first released to the public by then. Production continued for almost a year well on schedule for a 2011 release date. However, major delays in 2011 caused the season's air date to be pushed back to 2012, since many scenes consisting of radioactive material had to be cut out or edited. There were also some other things that did not make the final cut also, including some backgrounds, extra scenes, a flying squirrel concept and an episode about Dakota hosting the show when she locks Chef and Chris in a closet.

Air date conflict and production delays
As revealed by Christian Potenza on the Total Drama: Live Action Panel at Canada's 2011 Fan Expo, Total Drama: Revenge of the Island was originally scheduled to air in July 2011 in the United States and in September 2011 in Canada, but due to the 2011 Tōhoku earthquake and tsunami and the nuclear accident which caused many Japanese citizens to receive radiation poisoning, many staff members found some of the season's scenes of radioactive material and creatures to be considered insensitive to victims of the disaster. This initiated the producers decision to modify the storyline of the season in order to remove some of the radioactive references, leading to many scenes being edited out.

This process of re-editing the entire season required more production time, causing the U.S. air date to be delayed until September 2011 (the time when Canada was originally supposed to air the season), but failure to complete the full season by then (with many scenes that still had to be changed) now caused more delay for both the U.S. and Canada, until the season was fully finished by late 2011 for an early French airing. Total Drama: Revenge of the Island aired three months later on Canada than originally expected on January 5, 2012, while the new rescheduled air date for the U.S. was not until June 5, 2012 (eleven months later than the original air date of July 2011). However, France aired the entire season in just 8 days from December 21, 2011 to December 29, 2011, becoming the only country to air the season in 2011. Although, they only aired the French version of the season that did not include the voices from the original voice actors (except Chris and Chef).

On May 28, 2012, Australia also began to air the season almost as fast as France did (one episode per weekday), but this time in English. Italy started to air the season on January 9, 2012, while Cartoon Network also aired the season in the Netherlands, Romania, Scandinavia and Hungary starting on March 5, 2012, Russia and Bulgaria on March 6, 2012, Poland and Africa on March 8, 2012 and Latin America on April 2, 2012. Originally, the season finale was set to air in the U.S. on September 11, 2012, but was instead pulled up to August 28 (two weeks from the original date) due to that date being a national memorial holiday. The final two episodes were then combined into a one-hour full-length season finale.

History
On March 25, 2011, the designs of all the 13 contestants were revealed. On March 27, 2011, all the names and personalities of the contestants were revealed in a press release. On April 5, 2011, Christian Potenza posted a YouTube video of him recording the first line of Total Drama: Revenge of the Island. The quote was:

This line is used for the promotional trailer that Teletoon showed at the end of the Total Drama World Tour finale, which was first released on April 24, 2011 (Easter Sunday). On June 1, 2011 Christian Potenza released on his Facebook the new season logo along with more final designs of the characters. On June 3, 2011, there were snapshots of radioactive Camp Wawanakwa. On August 25, 2011 the Total Drama: Revenge of the Island flipbook was released. On August 28, 2011, the first official cast image was released to the public via Facebook. On September 24, 2011, the third official trailer was released which contained new scenes and confirmed the team assignments. On September 27, 2011, at the Total Drama: Live Action Panel at Canada's 2011 Fan Expo, Cory Doran confirmed all of Mike's personalities, and Christian Potenza said that the team name for the Radioactive Rats was scrapped. On October 13, 2011, Christian Potenza revealed several things about the intro of the season and said that promos will be out soon. On November 28, 2011, the official Canadian air date for the season was announced to air on January 5, 2012. On December 14, 2011, an animated interview with Chris McLean and a fan was released and revealed that the new team name is now "Toxic Rats". On December 18, 2011, the official Total Drama: Revenge of the Island website was launched that includes interactive menus and biographies of all the new contestants, as well as videos and season descriptions. On December 21, 2011, France began to air the season's episodes, two weeks before Canada. On Christmas 2011, all of the auditions of the 13 new characters were released on Teletoon's official Total Drama site. Cartoon Network viewers were able to vote for Zoey before the finale due to them airing Episode 12 and 13 on the same day.

Reception

Total Drama: Revenge of the Island has received mixed to positive reviews, attracting some criticism for its shorter length in comparison to the previous seasons. In the United States, over 3.3 million people have viewed the season, with over 51% growth over last year, making Total Drama: Revenge of the Island the #1 telecast of the year for Cartoon Network. Tom McGillis said in a 2012 interview that both Total Drama: Revenge of the Island and Total Drama Island are the highest rated seasons of the series. This season has been viewed in over 100 countries, worldwide. On Metacritic, the season currently holds a 7.3, which indicates "generally favorable reviews".

Media
Madman Entertainment released Season 4 of Total Drama on October 8, 2014 on a Region 4 DVD.

See also

Notes

References

External links

The trailer for TDRI (Teletoon)
Season 4 Page Cake Entertainment
The third TDRI trailer

Revenge of the Island
2012 Canadian television series debuts
2010s Canadian animated television series
2010s Canadian satirical television series
Canadian adult animated comedy television series
Canadian children's animated comedy television series
Television shows set in Ontario
Television shows filmed in Toronto
Canadian flash animated television series
2012 Canadian television seasons